Pterolophia subangusta is a species of beetle in the family Cerambycidae. It was described by Masaki Matsushita in 1933.

References

subangusta
Beetles described in 1933